Brzozówka  is a village in the administrative district of Gmina Grabów nad Pilicą, within Kozienice County, Masovian Voivodeship, in east-central Poland. The village has a population of 272 residents.

References

Villages in Kozienice County